The Ermita de Nuestra Señora de la Estrella is a Baroque hermitage in the city of Toledo (Castile-La Mancha, Spain) was founded by the co-fraternity of hortelanos, which had its headquarters in the neighboring church of Santiago del Arrabal.

Its construction was completed in the 14th century, according to traces of Juan Bautista Monegro, at that time main master of the cathedral.

It has paintings and altars with Solomonic columns from the 18th Century.

References

External links

Bien de Interés Cultural landmarks in the Province of Toledo
Roman Catholic churches completed in 1611
Christian hermitages in Spain
Roman Catholic churches in Toledo, Spain
14th-century Roman Catholic church buildings in Spain